An aditus is the opening to some interior space or cavity. It may refer to:

 Aditus to mastoid antrum, in the ear
 Laryngeal aditus, the opening that connects the pharynx and the larynx
 Omental foramen or aditus, in the abdomen